The Old Fort Pierce Post Office is a historic building in Fort Pierce, Florida. It was built in 1935 by the Works Progress Administration and designed by architect Louis A. Simon in the Mediterranean Revival Style. As a civic structure it provided the city with a place for chance meetings and neighborly interaction. It is located at 500 Orange Avenue. On February 11, 2002, it was added to the U.S. National Register of Historic Places.

See also 
List of United States post offices

References

External links 

 National Register of Historic Places.com: St. Lucie County NRHP listings
 National Register of Historic Places registration form

Old Fort Pierce Post Office
Buildings and structures in St. Lucie County, Florida
Fort Pierce
National Register of Historic Places in St. Lucie County, Florida
Post office buildings on the National Register of Historic Places in Florida
Old Fort Pierce Post Office